Evelyn Felisa Ankers (August 17, 1918 – August 29, 1985) was a British-American actress who often played variations on the role of the cultured young leading lady in many American horror films during the 1940s, most notably The Wolf Man (1941) opposite Lon Chaney Jr., a frequent screen partner.

Early years 
Ankers was born to British parents in Valparaíso, Chile. She was educated at The Latymer School, the Golophyn School, the Tacchomo School of Music and Dramatic Art, and the Royal Academy of Dramatic Art in London.

Stage 
Ankers' stage debut came in Colombia at age 10 when she had the title role in The Daughter of Dolores. On Broadway, she had the role of Lucy Gilham in Ladies in Retirement (1940). In London, she acted in Bats in the Belfry.

Film

Known as "the Queen of the Bs", Ankers starred in films including  The Wolf Man (1941), The Ghost of Frankenstein (1942), Captive Wild Woman (1943), Son of Dracula (1943), The Mad Ghoul (1943), Jungle Woman (1944), Weird Woman (1944), The Invisible Man's Revenge (1944), and The Frozen Ghost (1945). She appeared in Hold That Ghost (1941), Sherlock Holmes and the Voice of Terror (1942), His Butler's Sister (1943), The Pearl of Death (1944), Pardon My Rhythm (1944), Tarzan's Magic Fountain (1949), and played Calamity Jane in The Texan Meets Calamity Jane (1950), one of many movies for which she received top billing. A frequent screen partner was Lon Chaney Jr., although they privately disliked each other.

Ankers made over fifty films between 1936 and 1950, then retired from movies at the age of 32 to be a housewife. She occasionally played television roles, such as that of saloon owner Robbie James in the 1958 episode "Gambler" of the ABC/Warner Brothers western series Cheyenne, with Clint Walker in the title role.

Ten years later she made her last film, No Greater Love (1960), with her husband Richard Denning.

Personal life
On September 6, 1942, Ankers married Richard Denning, to whom she remained married until her death in 1985. The couple had one child, Diana Denning (later Dwyer). Ankers moved to Hawaii when her husband accepted the role of the governor in Hawaii 5-0. She died of ovarian cancer at the age of 67 on August 29, 1985 in Maui.  Ankers and Denning are buried at Makawao Veterans' Cemetery in Makawao, Hawaii.

Ankers became an American citizen in August 1946.

Selected filmography

 Land Without Music (1936) as A Lady of the Court (segment "Who said Carlini?") (uncredited)
 Rembrandt (1936) as Party Girl (uncredited)
 Fire Over England (1937) as Lady-in-Waiting (uncredited)
 Wings of the Morning (1937) as Party Guest (uncredited)
 Knight Without Armour (1937) as Minor Role (uncredited)
 Murder in the Family (1938) as Dorothy Osborne
 The Claydon Treasure Mystery (1938) as Rosemary Shackleford
 Coming of Age (1938) as Christine Squire
 The Villiers Diamond (1938) as Joan Raymond
 Second Thoughts (1938) as Molly Frame
 Over the Moon (1939) as Sanitarium Patient (uncredited)
 Bachelor Daddy (1941) as Beth Chase
 Hit the Road (1941) as Patience Ryan
 Hold That Ghost (with Abbott and Costello) (1941) as Norma Lind
 Burma Convoy (1941) as Ann McBragel
 The Wolf Man (with Lon Chaney, Jr. and Bela Lugosi) (1941) as Gwen Conliffe
 North to the Klondike (with Broderick Crawford and Lon Chaney, Jr.) (1942) as Mary Sloan
 The Ghost of Frankenstein (with Lon Chaney, Jr. and Bela Lugosi) (1942) as Elsa Frankenstein
 Eagle Squadron (with Robert Stack and Diana Barrymore) (1942) as Nancy Mitchell
 Pierre of the Plains (1942) as Celia Wellsby
 Sherlock Holmes and the Voice of Terror (with Basil Rathbone) (1942) as Kitty
 The Great Impersonation (1942) as Lady Muriel Dominey
 Keep 'Em Slugging (1943) as Sheila
 Captive Wild Woman (1943) as Beth Colman
 All by Myself (1943) as Jean Wells
 Hers to Hold (1943) as Flo Simpson
 Crazy House (1943) as Evelyn Ankers (uncredited)
 Son of Dracula (with Lon Chaney, Jr.) (1943) as Claire Caldwell
 You're a Lucky Fellow, Mr. Smith (1943) as Lynn Smith
 The Mad Ghoul (with Robert Armstrong) (1943) as Isabel Lewis
 His Butler's Sister (1943, directed by Frank Borzage) as Elizabeth Campbell
 Ladies Courageous (with Loretta Young and Diana Barrymore) (1944) as Wilhelmina
 Weird Woman (1944) as Ilona Carr
 Follow the Boys (1944) as Evelyn Ankers (uncredited)
 Pardon My Rhythm (1944) as Julia Munson
 Jungle Woman (1944) as Beth Mason
 The Invisible Man's Revenge (with John Carradine) (1944) as Julie Herrick
 The Pearl of Death (with Basil Rathbone and Rondo Hatton) (1944) as Naomi Drake
 Bowery to Broadway (1944) as Bonnie Latour
 The Frozen Ghost (with Lon Chaney, Jr.) (1945) as Maura Daniel
 The Fatal Witness (1945) as Priscilla Ames
 The French Key (1946) as Janet Morgan
 Queen of Burlesque (1946) as Crystal McCoy
 Black Beauty (with Richard Denning) (1946) as Evelyn Carrington
 Flight to Nowhere (1946) as Catherine Forrest
 Spoilers of the North (1947) as Laura Reed
 Last of the Redmen (1947) as Alice Munro
 The Lone Wolf in London (with Gerald Mohr and Eric Blore) (1947) as Iris Chatham
 Parole, Inc. (with Michael O'Shea and Turhan Bey) (1948) as Jojo Dumont
 Tarzan's Magic Fountain (with Lex Barker) (1949) as Gloria James Jessup
 The Texan Meets Calamity Jane (1950) as Calamity Jane
 No Greater Love (with Richard Denning) (1960, Short) (final film role)

References

External links

 
 
 

1918 births
1985 deaths
American film actresses
American television actresses
British film actresses
British television actresses
Deaths from ovarian cancer
Deaths from cancer in Hawaii
People with acquired American citizenship
20th-century British actresses
British expatriates in Chile
British emigrants to the United States
20th-century American actresses
People from Valparaíso
People educated at The Latymer School